Knauertown is a village in Warwick Township, Chester County, Pennsylvania, USA. Located on Pennsylvania Route 23, the land in and around present-day Knauertown was bought and settled by Johann Christopher Knauer in 1753. Just east of Knauertown on Route 23 is the Seven Day Graveyard, which contains the graves of Knauer and many of his descendants. Nearby is Saint Peter's Village, which was owned by the Knauer family as well. Knauertown borders East Nantmeal via Iron Bridge. Iron Bridge is a notable landmark for its use as an internet meme related to the 2022 Philadelphia Phillies' World Series appearance.

References 

Unincorporated communities in Chester County, Pennsylvania
Unincorporated communities in Pennsylvania